Ikast-Brande is a municipality (Danish, kommune) in Region Midtjylland in Denmark. It covers an area of 733.69 km2 and has a population of 41,885 (1. January 2022).

On 1 January 2007 Ikast-Brande municipality was created as the result of Kommunalreformen ("The Municipal Reform" of 2007), consisting of the former municipalities of Brande, Ikast, and Nørre-Snede.

Locations

Politics

Municipal council
Ikast-Brande's municipal council consists of 23 members, elected every four years.

Below are the municipal councils elected since the Municipal Reform of 2007.

References 
 
 Municipal statistics: NetBorger Kommunefakta, delivered from KMD  Kommunedata (Municipal Data)
 Municipal mergers and neighbors: Eniro new municipalities map

External links 

 Ikast-Brande municipality's official website 

 
Municipalities of the Central Denmark Region
Municipalities of Denmark
Populated places established in 2007